The Mondrian, designed by famed Dallas architect Thomas Brink, is a 20-story high-rise located at 3000 Blackburn Street in the Cityplace neighborhood of Oak Lawn, Dallas, Texas, United States.  Construction started on the structure in 2003 and the building was completed in 2005,

The building is located at the corner of McKinney Avenue and Blackburn Street.  A central high-rise tower 20 stories high containing 146 dwelling units anchors the structure's postmodern architectural theme. The tower is flanked by 72 two-story urban loft units.

At street level, approximately 20,000 square feet (1,900 m2) of retail shops are incorporated into the Mondrian project. Pedestrian access to the retail areas is provided via upgraded perimeter sidewalks in addition to ground level parking within the building for retail customers. Residents have access to a secured multilevel parking deck and a garden pool amenity area.

See also
List of tallest buildings in Dallas

References

External links 
 The Mondrian at Cityplace
 West Village

Residential skyscrapers in Dallas
Buildings and structures completed in 2005
Apartment buildings in Texas